People of Rome is a 2003  Italian comedy mockumentary film directed by  Ettore Scola. It is close to Federico Fellini's Roma.

The film is dedicated to Alberto Sordi, whom Scola had wanted to cast as a nobleman in the final scene. Sordi died before this could come to pass.

Scola's daughters co-wrote the script.

Plot
Rome 2003, the camera follows citizens of Rome. Night, in a flat, a woman prepares her husband's lunch. The man takes a bus, but the camera follow another bus ... a woman cleans the mayor's office...  A man interviews passengers on a bus about immigration...... the owner of a bar is racist person... a survivor woman of Holocaust remembers the Ghetto deportation... deportation that is filmed by a director... Stefania Sandrelli plays with her grand daughter in a park a man tries to seduce the bus driver...gay night life... sunrise at Piazza Navona, a noble man and a tramp are sitting together.

External links 
 

2003 films
2003 comedy films
Documentary films about cities
Films directed by Ettore Scola
Films set in Rome
Italian comedy films
Films with screenplays by Ettore Scola